The Yucatan bobwhite  or black-throated bobwhite (Colinus nigrogularis) is a species of bird in the family Odontophoridae. It is found in Belize, Guatemala, Honduras, Mexico, and Nicaragua. Its natural habitats are subtropical or tropical dry shrubland, subtropical or tropical seasonally wet or flooded lowland grassland, coastal mangroves and heavily degraded former forest. A specific example of occurrence is the Petenes mangroves of the Yucatan.

Description
The male and female Yucatan bobwhite differ in appearance. The male has a black throat edged with white, a white forehead, a black eyestripe and a black crown. The upper neck, mantle and flanks are reddish-brown liberally speckled with white. The rest of the upper parts are brownish, barred withreddish-brown and grey. The underparts have a scalloped appearance as the white feathers are edged with black. The lower belly and under-tail coverts are cinnamon. The female is similar in appearance but the hind neck and mantle are black with paler speckling, the throat is buff and the breast and belly are white barred with reddish-brown and black.

Distribution and habitat
The Yucatan bobwhite is native to Central America where its range extends from the Yucatan Peninsula southwards to Honduras and Nicaragua. Its typical habitat is clearings in forests, pine savannah, rough grassland, weedy fields and plantations of henequen (Agave fourcroydes).

Status
The Yucatan bobwhite has an extensive range and is relatively common. The population size is believed to be stable and the International Union for Conservation of Nature has assessed its conservation status as being of "least concern".

References

 World Wildlife Fund. 2010. Petenes mangroves. eds. Mark McGinley, C.Michael Hogan & C.Cleveland. Encyclopedia of Earth. National Council for Science and the Environment. Washington DC

Yucatan bobwhite
Birds of the Yucatán Peninsula
Birds of Belize
Birds of Guatemala
Birds of Honduras
Birds of Nicaragua
Least concern biota of North America
Yucatan bobwhite
Taxonomy articles created by Polbot
Birds of Mexico